The inauguration of George H. W. Bush as the 41st president of the United States was held on Friday, January 20, 1989, at the West Front of the United States Capitol in Washington, D.C. This was the 51st inauguration and marked the commencement of the only term of both George H. W. Bush as president and Dan Quayle as vice president. Chief Justice William Rehnquist administered the presidential oath of office to Bush and Justice Sandra Day O'Connor administered the vice presidential oath of office to Quayle. Bush was the first sitting vice president to be inaugurated as president (not due to his predecessor's death or resignation) since Martin Van Buren in 1837 and the last World War II combat veteran.  Bush composed his own prayer for the ceremony which he recited at the start of his inaugural address; the last president to do so was Dwight D. Eisenhower at his first inauguration in 1953.

The event helped the Washington Metro set a single-day record of 604,089 trips, breaking the record of 565,000 set the spring before by the Washington for Jesus '88 rally. The record would stand until the day of the National Victory Celebration in 1991.

See also
Presidency of George H. W. Bush
Presidential transition of George H. W. Bush
Timeline of the George H. W. Bush presidency (1989)
1988 United States presidential election
George H. W. Bush 1988 presidential campaign

References

External links

George H.W. Bush inauguration, January 20, 1989, C-SPAN
Inauguration Day parade, January 20, 1989, C-SPAN
New York Times coverage of the 1989 inauguration
Text of Bush's Inaugural Address
Audio of Bush's Inaugural Address

1989 speeches
1989 in Washington, D.C.
1989 in American politics 
United States presidential inaugurations
Inauguration
January 1989 events in the United States
Speeches by George H. W. Bush